Ascalenia centropselia is a moth in the family Cosmopterigidae. It was described by Edward Meyrick in 1931. It is found in India.

References

Moths described in 1931
Ascalenia
Moths of Asia